Edith Longstreth Wood (1885-1967) was an American painter. She was a member of the Philadelphia Ten.

Biography
Longstreth was born in Philadelphia, Pennsylvania in 1885. From 1901 to 1905 she attended Bryn Mawr College, and from 1906 to 1907 she attended the Pennsylvania Academy of the Fine Arts.

Wood married William Wood in 1912. The couple lived in California until William's death in 1922, when she returned to Philadelphia.

Wood exhibited regularly at the Philadelphia Print Club, the Pennsylvania Academy of Fine Arts, and the Philadelphia Art Alliance. She was a member of the Philadelphia Art Alliance, the Philadelphia Print Club, the Philadelphia Ten, the Southern Vermont Artists, the Plastic Club, and the North Shore Art Association.

In 1937 the Pennsylvania Academy of Fine Arts purchased her painting "Anemones" for their collection.

Wood died in 1967. The same year the Pennsylvania Academy of Fine Arts held a one-woman memorial exhibition of her work.

References

1885 births
1967 deaths
20th-century American women artists
20th-century American painters
American women painters
Artists from Philadelphia
Painters from Pennsylvania
Bryn Mawr College alumni
Pennsylvania Academy of the Fine Arts alumni